Rachid Ghezzal (born 9 May 1992) is a professional footballer who plays as a winger for Süper Lig club Beşiktaş and the Algeria national team.

He began his career at Lyon, where he made his debut in October 2012. He played 119 games and scored 13 goals for them across all competitions. In August 2017, he moved to Monaco on a free transfer.

Born in France, Ghezzal represented France at under-20 level. He made his senior debut for his ancestral Algeria in 2015 and was part of their squad at the 2017 Africa Cup of Nations.

Club career

Lyon
Born in Décines-Charpieu, Metropolitan Lyon, in July 2010 Ghezzal signed a five-year élite contract with Lyon. After featuring with the club's reserve team in the Championnat de France Amateur for two consecutive seasons, ahead of the 2012–13 season, he was promoted to the senior team by manager Rémi Garde and assigned the number 31 shirt. Ghezzal made his senior team debut on 4 October 2012 in a UEFA Europa League group stage away match against Israeli club Ironi Kiryat Shmona; he started the match as Lyon won the contest 4–3.

In the 2013–14 season, Ghezzal suffered a back injury for the first six months of Lyon's campaign, which saw him out of action until 10 January 2014, missing 32 of Lyon's games in the process. He then returned to the squad but did not make any appearances for Lyon for the rest of the season; either being not named in match day squads or being named on the bench. Since January 2016, he had been playing regularly. He finished the 2015–16 season with 8 goals and 8 assists in 29 Ligue 1 matches. In June 2017, Lyon announced that Ghezzal's contract would not be renewed.

Monaco
On 7 August 2017, Ghezzal joined fellow Ligue 1 team Monaco by signing a four-year contract that would run until June 2021. It was reported that Monaco would pay him a signing bonus of €3 million and a monthly salary of about €180,000. As his Lyon contract had expired on 30 June 2017, he arrived on a free transfer.

Leicester City
On 5 August 2018, Ghezzal signed for English Premier League club Leicester City as a direct replacement for outgoing fellow countryman Riyad Mahrez, signing a four-year deal. In his first start for the club, he scored his first Leicester goal, a long range strike from outside the box, in a 4–0 win over Fleetwood Town.

Fiorentina (loan)
On 2 September 2019, Ghezzal was loaned to Italian Serie A side ACF Fiorentina on a season-long deal that included an option to buy.

Beşiktaş (loan)
On 5 September 2020, Ghezzal joined Turkish Süper Lig club Beşiktaş on a season-long loan. On 15 May 2021, he scored a penalty in a 2–1 away win over Göztepe, to secure the 2020–21 Süper Lig title for Beşiktaş.

Beşiktaş
On 12 August 2021, Beşiktaş announced the signing of Ghezzal from Leicester City on a three-year deal.

International career
At international senior level, Ghezzal was eligible to represent both France and Algeria and had stated his preference is to represent the latter nation. In 2013, he received the call from France U20 to compete in the Toulon Tournament. However, Ghezzal later chose to play for Algeria, scoring his first goal in March 2016 against Ethiopia.

Philanthropy
On 9 December 2018, Ghezzal appeared on a Sport dans la Ville digital philanthropy card. The digital philanthropy card featured the French non-profit, serving disadvantaged kids through sports and job training. It was his tribute to the organization of which he was part until the age of 12 years. During a meeting on 31 December 2013 with young members of Sport dans la Ville, Rachid explained the time he spent with Sport dans la Ville allowed him to reach the status of professional player.

Personal life
He's the younger brother of Algerian international Abdelkader Ghezzal.

Career statistics

Club

International

Scores and results list Algeria's goal tally first, score column indicates score after each Ghezzal goal.

Honours 
Lyon Reserves
Championnat de France Amateur: 2010–11, 2011–12

Beşiktaş
Süper Lig: 2020–21
Turkish Cup: 2020–21
Turkish Super Cup: 2021

Individual
Süper Lig Best Foreign Player: 2020–21
Süper Lig Top Assist Provider: 2020–21 (17 assists)
Süper Lig Right Winger of the Year: 2021–22

References

External links 
 
 
 
 
 

1992 births
Living people
People from Décines-Charpieu
Algerian footballers
Algeria international footballers
French footballers
France youth international footballers
Association football wingers
Olympique Lyonnais players
AS Monaco FC players
Leicester City F.C. players
ACF Fiorentina players
Beşiktaş J.K. footballers
Ligue 1 players
Premier League players
Serie A players
Süper Lig players
2017 Africa Cup of Nations players
Algerian expatriate footballers
French expatriate footballers
Algerian expatriate sportspeople in England
French expatriate sportspeople in England
Expatriate footballers in England
Algerian expatriate sportspeople in Italy
French expatriate sportspeople in Italy
Expatriate footballers in Italy
French expatriate sportspeople in Turkey
Algerian expatriate sportspeople in Turkey
Expatriate footballers in Turkey
French sportspeople of Algerian descent
Sportspeople from Lyon Metropolis
Footballers from Auvergne-Rhône-Alpes